Donna Morrissey (born in The Beaches, Newfoundland) is a Canadian author.

At age 16, Morrissey left her birthplace of The Beaches, a small outport on the west coast of Newfoundland. She lived in various places in Canada before returning to St. John's, where she studied at Memorial University and obtained a Bachelor of Social Work and a diploma in adult education. Morrissey now lives in Halifax, Nova Scotia.

Morrissey has written six national best sellers and prize-winning novels — Kit's Law, Downhill Chance, Sylvanus Now, What They Wanted, The Deception of Livvy Higgs, and The Fortunate Brother — as well as one Gemini-nominated screenplay.  In 2021 She published a memoir, Pluck: A Memoir of a Newfoundland Childhood and the Raucous, Terrible, Amazing Journey to becoming a Novelist.

Morrissey defended Frank Parker Day's novel Rockbound in Canada Reads 2005. Rockbound eventually won the competition. In the 2007 edition of Canada Reads, an "all-star" competition pitting the five winning advocates from previous years against each other, Morrissey returned to champion Anosh Irani's novel The Song of Kahunsha.

Bibliography
Kit's Law
Downhill Chance
Sylvanus Now
What They Wanted
The Deception of Livvy Higgs
The Fortunate Brother
Pluck: A memoir of a Newfoundland Childhood and the Raucous, Terrible, Amazing Journey to Becoming a Novelist

Filmography
Clothesline Patch (screenplay)
nominated for Gemini for Best Writing

Awards and recognition
For Sylvanus Now:
Winner of the Thomas Head Raddall Award
Atlantic Booksellers Choice Award
 Short-listed for the Commonwealth Writers' Prize
For Downhill Chance:
Winner of the Thomas Head Raddall Award
For Kit's Law:
Winner of the Canadian Booksellers Association Libris Award
Winner of the Winifred Holtby Memorial Prize 
Winner of the American Library Association Alex Award
Shortlisted for the Books in Canada First Novel Award
Shortlisted for the Atlantic Provinces Booksellers' Choice Award
Shortlisted for the Thomas Head Raddall Award
For Clothesline Patch:
Winner, Best Production, 2002 Gemini Awards
nominated Best Writing
For The Deception of Livvy Higgs:
One Book Nova Scotia selection, 2016
For "''The Fortunate Brother":

Winner of the Thomas Head Raddall Award

Winner of Arthur Ellis Award for Best Crime Book of 2017

External links
Author page at Penguin Canada
Donna Morrissey's web page
Donna Morrissey's entry in The Canadian Encyclopedia

Online interview from CBC Words at Large

21st-century Canadian novelists
Canadian people of Irish descent
Canadian women novelists
Living people
People from Newfoundland (island)
Writers from Newfoundland and Labrador
21st-century Canadian women writers
Year of birth missing (living people)